Paul Tavernier (31 January 1852, Paris - 1943, Fontainebleau) was a French painter who specialized in hunting scenes and animals.

Biography 

He was a student of Alexandre Cabanel, Adolphe Yvon and Gustave Guillaumet, who advised him to visit North Africa as a means of lightening his palette. He had his debut at the Salon in 1876. Three years later, he began painting en plein aire near Barbizon, and came under the influence of the painters who had made up the art colony there.

In 1883, he became a member of the Société des artistes français and was awarded a third-class medal for works he had created during his stay in Africa. He would continue to send paintings to their exhibits until 1937.

He was not only an admirer of the area where he chose to paint, he also became involved in the municipal affairs of Fontainebleau, participating in projects to develop the city and preserve its environment. Later, he created murals for the municipal theatre, depicting King Louis XV on a hunt.

He received bronze medal at the Exposition Universelle of 1900 and, in 1905, a second-class medal at an exhibition of the École des Paysagistes.

He was last heard from in 1943, during World War II. A street in Fontainebleau bears his name.

References

External links 

More works by Tavernier @ ArtNet

1852 births
1943 deaths
20th-century French painters
Animal painters
French landscape painters
Painters from Paris
19th-century French painters